The 2012 Tour of Belgium was the 82nd edition of the Tour of Belgium cycling stage race. It took place from 23 May to 27 May 2012 in Belgium. The race is part of the UCI Europe Tour. It began with three relatively short stages, followed by two stages meant to be deciding the tour: an individual time-trial on Saturday and a longer stage through the hills of the Ardennes.

Different comparing to the previous years was that the leader in the race will wore a red jersey (instead of black), whereas the black jersey went to the most combative rider. To decide the combativity, there were three sprints in each stage (except for the time-trial), where in case of a breakaway, the first five riders earned points (10, 8, 6, 4 and 2). Based on the lead the breakaway has on the peloton, these riders received bonus points, going from 1 point for a 30-second lead up to 5 points for a lead of 4 minutes or more. Another change, as introduced during the 2011 Tour de France, was the so-called "supersprint": each stage had one supersprint, where riders earned points that counted for the yellow sprint jersey and bonification seconds for the general classification.

Schedule

Teams
Twenty-one teams have been invited to the 2011 Tour of Belgium: 7 teams are from the UCI ProTeams, 7 are UCI Professional Continental Teams and 7 are UCI Continental Teams.

Stages

Stage 1
23 May 2012 – Mechelen to Buggenhout, 

Early throughout the race, a breakaway of eight riders formed, consisting of Paolo Ciavatta, Leonardo Duque, Simon Geschke, Arnaud Jouffroy, Egidijus Juodvalkis, Philippe Legrand, Michael Schär and Jelle Wallays. With only 17 kilometres to go, Ciavatta, Schär and Wallays sprinted away from the group. They were however not able to stay out of the grasp of the peloton, where mainly  and  had been chasing hard.

The peloton sprinted for the stage win in Buggenhout, where a photo finish was necessary to decide the winner as three riders crossed the line nearly simultaneously. Although Danilo Napolitano ostensively gestured and seemed sure of the victory, the photo finish clearly showed André Greipel to cross the line first, with Napolitano in second and Kenny van Hummel in third. Due to the bonification seconds, Greipel became the first overall leader. He also took the first yellow jersey as leader in the sprint classification, while Leonardo Duque took the black jersey as most combative.

Stage 2
24 May 2012 – Lochristi to Knokke-Heist, 

With still 145 kilometres to go, a group of five pelotonriders broke away from the peloton, achieving a lead of up to five minutes over the main bunch. The five riders were Pim Ligthart, Mark McNally, Aleksejs Saramotins, Ramon Sinkeldam and Jay Thomson. It was only when  stepped up to help, the gap reduced further.

In the lead group, Sinkeldam sped away from the others and while the others were caught, he managed to stay out of the grasp of the peloton up to two kilometres of the finish line. For the second day in a row, the peloton sprinted for the stage win, with André Greipel and Danilo Napolitano again finishing first and second. Jacopo Guarnieri was the third man on the podium and due to the bonification seconds he became the new leader in the youth classification. Because of his win, Greipel strengthened his lead in both the general classification and the sprint classification. Leonardo Duque was still leading the combativity classification.

Stage 3
25 May 2012 – Knokke-Heist to Beveren, 

Maxim Belkov, Tijmen Eising, Alessandro Donati, Pieter Vanspeybrouck en Coen Vermeltfoort were the attackers of the day. Belkov held out the longest, being caught only 8 kilometres from the finish line, before the third peloton sprint in three days was a fact. André Greipel and Danilo Napolitano again took the top two places. The jerseys did not change hands, except for the white jersey, which went to Adam Blythe.

Stage 4
26 May 2012 – Turnhout to Arendonk,

Stage 5
27 May 2012 – Clavier to Engis,

Classification leadership table

Final standings

General classification

Points classification

Combativity classification

Young rider classification

Team classification

References

External links
Race website

Tour of Belgium
Tour of Belgium
Tour of Belgium